Jolán is a Hungarian female given name, derived from the Hungarian words of Jó and leán (jó leány in modern Hungarian), meaning good girl. In Czechia, it is interpreted also as an East-Slavic version of the Greek name Helen (Helena). Pronounced yaw-lah-nah.

Name days 
 Hungarian: 15 January, 18 and 20 November
 Czech: 15 September
 Slovak: 15 September

People with given name Jolana 
 Jolana Fogašová, Slovak opera singer
 Jolana Neméthová (born 1954), Czechoslovak handball player

See also 
 Jolana (guitar brand) – maker of Czech guitars

External links 
 

Slovak feminine given names
Czech feminine given names
Hungarian feminine given names